The Brazil of Hope Federation or FE Brasil is a federation of Brazilian parties formed by the Workers' Party (PT), Communist Party of Brazil (PCdoB) and Green Party (PV) on 18 April 2022 in preparation for the 2022 general election.

History

Background
In 2017, the National Congress of Brazil approved a constitutional amendment which abolished legislative coalitions and established an electoral threshold to receive party subsidies. The electoral reform aimed to decrease the effective number of parties in Brazil. After the reform, smaller parties wanted to create a new mechanism to help them win seats, with many proposing single non-transferable vote. In 2021, it was approved the creation of party federations, based on the Broad Front model.

After the federations approved, there began talks to form left-of-center federations, which began official talks to form a federation between the Workers' Party, the Brazilian Socialist Party (PSB), the Socialism and Liberty Party (PSOL), the Communist Party of Brazil and the Green Party in late 2021. PSOL quickly left the negotiations, preferring to focus on a federation with the Sustainability Network (REDE). Negotiations between PT and PSB got into advanced stages, with a broad majority of PSB politicians wanting to join the PT-lead federation, but PSB withdrew from the federation because of disagreements over São Paulo, especially due to the gubernatorial and mayoral candidates.

Formation
In April 2022, PT, PCdoB and PV approved a federation and subsequently sent it to the Superior Electoral Court. It was approved and the federation was officially formed.

Composition
The federation consists of three (3) political parties:

Electoral history

Legislative elections

References

2022 establishments in Brazil
Left-wing political party alliances
Political parties established in 2022
Political party alliances in Brazil
Luiz Inácio Lula da Silva